Lieutenant General Henry Harpur Greer CB (24 February 1821 - 27 March 1886) was an Irish-born officer who served in the British Army during the Victorian era. During the New Zealand Wars, he commanded the 68th Durham Regiment of Foot during the Tauranga Campaign, and commanded the entirety of the British forces at the Battle of Te Ranga.

References

1821 births
1886 deaths
Durham Light Infantry
New Zealand Wars